I Am You (stylized as I am YOU) is the third extended play by South Korean boy group Stray Kids. The EP was released digitally and physically on October 22, 2018, by JYP Entertainment and distributed through Iriver. A showcase titled Stray Kids Unveil: Op. 03: I Am You was held the day before the release at Olympic Hall. The album sold 76,547 physical copies in the month of October.

The album was released in two versions—an “I am” version and a “YOU” version.

Track listing 
Credits adapted from Melon

Charts

Weekly charts

Year-end charts

Certifications

Notes

References 

2018 EPs
JYP Entertainment EPs
Korean-language EPs
Stray Kids EPs
IRiver EPs